Scythris emichi is a species of moth belonging to the family Scythrididae.

Synonym:
 Butalis emichi Anker, 1870

References

Scythrididae